İsken Sugözü power station is a 1320 MW operational coal fired power station in Turkey.

History
The plant started operating in 2003.

Ownership
STEAG has 51% share and OYAK 49%.

Coal supply

Electricity generation

Health and Environmental Impact

Local pollution
There is a lot of heavy industry around Iskenderun Bay, including two other coal-fired power stations, Atlas and Emba Hunutlu. Cancers increased in the decade since the plant started and respiratory diseases increased during the 2010s, but because smokestack measurements are only sent to the government not published, it is difficult to estimate how much of the air pollution illnesses and deaths are due to the power plants. However İsken Sugözü is the oldest and the only one using subcritical technology, so is likely to be more polluting per GWh electricity generated than the other two coal-fired power stations (a study for China estimated 200 to 400 early deaths per GW-year). Mercury emissions have been estimated at over 200 kg/year. It is estimated that closing the plant by 2030, instead of when its licence ends in 2039, would prevent over 3000 premature deaths.

As well as the plant discharging into the bay, a ship carrying coal ash was wrecked there.

Greenhouse gases
The power station emits more than 5 megatonnes (Mt) of carbon dioxide a year, which is over 1% of Turkey's greenhouse gas emissions. As Turkey has no carbon emission trading it would not be economically viable to capture and store the gas.

Opposition
There were protests by Greenpeace and others. Opposition to the power plant carried forward to opposition to Emba Hunutlu power station in the late 2010s.

See also

Energy in Turkey
List of power stations in Turkey
Electricity sector in Turkey

References

Sources

External links

 İsken Sugözü power station on Global Energy Monitor

Coal-fired power stations in Turkey
Buildings and structures in Adana
Protests in Turkey
Environmentalism in Turkey